Yengicə (also, Yengidzha, Yengija and Yenidzha) is a village and municipality in the Sharur District of Nakhchivan, Azerbaijan. It is located 2 km south-west from the district center, on the Sharur plain. Its population is busy with gardening and farming. There are secondary school, music school, cultural house, kindergarten, flour mill, two mosques and a medical center in the village. It has a population of 3,840. The monument was erected in honor of its compatriots who died in The Great Patriotic War. And also there is a bust of National Hero of Azerbaijan Sayavush Hasanov which was born in this village.

Etymology
Yengicə (Yengija) is the phonetic form of the name of the Yenicə (Yenija). The villages called Yenicə and Yengicə were created on the result of the building new point of residence by the population which (mostly due to deficiency of the soil) moved out from the main village. The name means "the new village".

Historical monuments 
Yengija bath was built at the end of the 18th century by Tovuz Khanum from Shahtakht. The total area of the rectangular bath is 650 square meters. The building was built using baked bricks and lime measuring 19x19x5 cm. The bath building is divided into two octagonal halls and two auxiliary rooms adjacent to them. The hearth of the bathhouse is located in the south of the building.

The building of the bathhouse was restored from March 2017 to September 2018. Currently, it is not used as a bathroom. In the historical building, service was organized in 7 different areas.

Notable natives 
 
 Sayavush Hasanov — National Hero of Azerbaijan.

References 

Populated places in Sharur District